The 1970–71 season was FC Dinamo București's 22nd season in Divizia A. Dinamo is close to their second double in Romania, but fails to win the Romanian Cup, losing again the final against Steaua. In was the fourth final in a row played by Dinamo. After a two-year break, Dinamo is back in the European cups, playing in the Inter-Cities Fairs Cup where is eliminated in the second round by Liverpool F.C..

Results

Romanian Cup final

Inter-Cities Fairs Cup 

First round

Dinamo București won 5-1 on aggregate

Second round

Liverpool F.C. won 4-1 on aggregate

Squad 

Goalkeepers: Mircea Constantinescu (27 / 0); Marin Andrei (4 / 0); Iosif Cavai (1 / 0).
Defenders: Florin Cheran (27 / 1); Ion Nunweiller (20 / 0); Mircea Stoenescu (20 / 0); Cornel Dinu (24 / 4); Gabriel Sandu (9 / 0); Augustin Deleanu (27 / 3); Augustin Deleanu (27 / 3); Constantin Ștefan (8 / 0); Nicolae Petre (2 / 0).
Midfielders:  Viorel Sălceanu (26 / 8); Alexandru Mustățea (18 / 0); Radu Nunweiller (30 / 5).
Forwards: Alexandru Moldovan (12 / 0); Petre Nuțu (12 / 0); Florea Dumitrache (28 / 15); Mircea Lucescu (23 / 3);  Gavril Both (10 / 1); Doru Popescu (22 / 7); Ion Haidu (14 / 2); Ion Moț (3 / 0).
(league appearances and goals listed in brackets)

Manager: Nicolae Dumitru.

Transfers 

Before the season, Dinamo transferred Alexandru Mustățea from Universitatea Cluj, and Mircea Constantinescu from Politehnica Iaşi. Ion Nunweiller returned after two seasons spent at Fenerbahçe. Constantin Frățilă went to FC Argeş, Ion Pîrcălab to Nîmes Olympique, in France and Vasile Gergely to Hertha Berlin. Ion Moţ is transferred from Unirea Alba Iulia during the season. Gabriel Sandu is promoted from the second team.

References 

 www.labtof.ro
 www.romaniansoccer.ro

1970
Association football clubs 1970–71 season
Dinamo
1970